The Rand Light Infantry (RLI) is an infantry regiment of the South African Army. As a reserve unit, it has a status roughly equivalent to that of a British Army Reserve unit or United States Army National Guard unit.

History

Origin
The history of this Regiment dates back to the Transvaal Cycle Corps, which was formed in Johannesburg on 1 October 1905 from the Bicycle Section of the Transvaal Scottish Regiment. A small section of this unit subsequently took part in the suppression of the Bambata Rebellion in Zululand.

After its return from this conflict the unit recognised the possibilities of mechanisation and members of the Regiment manufactured three armoured cars, creating a motorised fighting unit. This led to the renaming of the unit in 1909 to the Transvaal Cycle and Motor Corps.

On 1 July 1913 the Regiment was renamed the 11th Infantry (Rand Light Infantry) and transferred to the Active Citizen Force of the Union Defence Force. Simultaneously, the unit was converted to a normal infantry regiment. The Regiment's Pretoria detachment was transferred to the 12th Infantry (Pretoria Regiment).

World War One
During World War I the Regiment took part in the South-West Africa, suffering light casualties – only two dead and eleven wounded.

In 1932 the Regiment was renamed the Rand Light Infantry.

World War Two
The RLI was mobilized for World War II in June 1940 and gained fame in North Africa where it took part in many front line engagements and earned battle honours at Bardia, Gazala and El Alamein. (See 1st SA Infantry Division) After the defeat of Rommel’s Afrika Korps, the RLI returned to South Africa and was merged with the Duke of Edinburgh’s Own Rifles. The remaining members of the Regiment were trained in armour, and sent as reinforcements to the South African 6th Armoured Division in Italy.

Border War
The Regiment took part in the South African Border War.

Freedom of Entry
The  exercised its freedom of entry into Johannesburg on 9 November 2013 as part of the centenary celebrations of the City of Johannesburg with
fixed bayonets, colours flying and drums beating.

Regimental Symbols
Regimental motto:  (He conquers who endures)
The RLI were allied to the Duke of Cornwall's Light Infantry in 1932. This alliance later fell into abeyance but was resurrected in April 1995, when the Regiment became allied with The Light Infantry Regiment
Regimental March: One and All and Trelawney.
Regimental slow march: Duke of York and Preobajensky March.
Regimental double march: Keel Row.

Previous Dress Insignia

Current Dress Insignia

Alliances
 – The Rifles

Battle honours

The RLI has been awarded the following Battle Honours:
South West Africa 1914-1915, Western Desert 1941 – 1943, Bardia, Gazala, El Alamein, Alamein Defence

Leadership 

-->

References

External links
 
 RLI Roll of Honour 
 
 
 

Infantry regiments of South Africa
Military units and formations in Johannesburg
Military units and formations established in 1932
Military units and formations of South Africa in World War I
Military units and formations of South Africa in World War II
Military units and formations of South Africa in the Border War